Poland competed at the 1994 Winter Paralympics in Lillehammer, Norway. 15 competitors from Poland won 10 medals including 2 gold, 3 silver and 5 bronze and finished 12th in the medal table.

Medalists

Gold
 Marcin Kos - Cross-country skiing, Standing 10 km Individual Free LW5/7
 Marcin Kos - Cross-country skiing, Standing 20 km Individual Classic LW5/7

Silver
 Piotr Sulkowski - Cross-country skiing, Standing 20 km Individual Classic LW2/3/9
 Jan Kołodziej - Cross-country skiing, Standing 5 km Individual Classic LW2/3/9
 Marcin Kos - Cross-country skiing, Standing 5 km Individual Classic LW5/7

Bronze
 Zenona Baniewicz - Cross-country skiing, Standing 10 km Individual Classic LW2/3/4
 Jan Kołodziej - Cross-country skiing, Standing 20 km Individual Classic LW2/3/9
 Jerzy Szlezak - Cross-country skiing, Standing 5 km Individual Classic LW5/7
 Jerzy Szlezak - Cross-country skiing, Standing 10 km Individual Free LW5/7
 Jerzy Szlezak - Cross-country skiing, Standing 20 km Individual Classic LW5/7

Alpine skiing

Biathlon

Cross‑country skiing

See also 
 Poland at the Paralympics
 Poland at the 1994 Winter Olympics

References 

Poland at the Paralympics
1994 in Polish sport
Nations at the 1994 Winter Paralympics